Brocchinia septentrionalis is a species of sea snail, a marine gastropod mollusk in the family Cancellariidae, the nutmeg snails.

Description
The shell grows to a length of 5 mm.

Distribution
This marine species is found along New Zealand.

References

 Finlay H.J. (1930) Additions to the Recent fauna of New Zealand. No. 3. Transactions and Proceedings of the Royal Society of New Zealand 61: 222–247. [Published 23 August 1930] page(s): 240 
 Hemmen J. (2007). Recent Cancellariidae. Wiesbaden, 428pp

Cancellariidae
Gastropods described in 1930